John DeLario was a prominent architect known for his work in the Hollywoodland area in Los Angeles during the 1920s. His designs reflect the romantic period revival popular during the time, influenced by Spanish, Italian, and French styles. Many of his designs still remain today, including the Castillo del Lago, once owned by Madonna. DeLario designed over thirty homes in the original Hollywoodland tract.

Notable Homes

Ralph B. Lloyd Estate 
DeLario designed an Italian villa for oilman Ralph B. Lloyd in Beverly Hills that was completed in 1930. The estate was built on a multi-acre property in the Ledgemont Park tract in Beverly Hills. Completed in 1930, the Lloyd mansion at 962 North Alpine Drive has been noted for its charm and distinction and an example of the type of architecture found in Southern California.

Castillo del Lago 
DeLario designed the Castillo del Lago "castle on the lake" located at 6342 Mulholland Highway. This Spanish style estate was constructed by Western Construction Company and completed in 1926 for oilman Patrick M. Longan. It features 20 rooms on nine floors.

The estate was purchased in 1993 by the American singer, songwriter, and actress Madonna for about five million dollars. It was notably renovated under her ownership from "a grand Andalusian Spanish house into a root-beer-red faux Florentine villa" (Crosby Doe, Curbed).

133 South Plymouth Boulevard 
This house marked John DeLario's first assignment in the historic Windsor Square neighborhood in the Hancock Park area of Los Angeles, California. It was built in 1923 for M. J. O’Dowd by the Birch O’Neal Co.

Sidney Woodruff Residence. 
Built in 1926, The Sidney Woodruff Residence was commissioned by the developer of Hollywoodland to be his own private home. Built by the Western Construction Company and designed in the Spanish Colonial Revival style. The residence was used as a model home for the Hollywoodland development. The residence was made a Cultural Heritage Monument in the year 2000 by its current owner.

Andrew Getty Estate 
This Spanish-style villa was built in 1926, and owned by the late Andrew Getty, American oil heir and grandson of industrialist J. Paul Getty. Before him, it was owned by three-time Oscar-winning film composer Miklos Rozsa. Set behind gates on seven acres, it features grand views of Griffith Observatory and the San Fernando Valley.

620 South Rossmore Avenue 

Another DeLario home in the historic Windsor Square neighborhood of Los Angeles, California.

Hollywoodland 

DeLario's influence is apparent when you enter the Hollywoodland historic granite gates which he designed. He also designed the Hollywoodland Real Estate Office and the commercial building on the west side of the village. DeLario maintained his offices on site at 2684 North Beachwood in a commercial complex he had designed to serve the new development. His quaint cottages and spiraling castles mark his breadth of style in Los Angeles.

References 

Year of birth missing
20th-century American architects
Architects from Los Angeles
Year of death missing